Luke Gross (born November 21, 1969) is an American former rugby union player and current rugby coach and administrator. A lock who played for various club sides, he earned 62 caps for the United States between 1996 and 2003. Gross was the all-time caps leader for the United States, until Mike MacDonald broke his record in 2011.

Since retiring as a player, Gross has served as a rugby administrator and coach. He was the head coach of PRO Rugby team Sacramento Express in 2016.

Playing career
Gross was born in Decatur, Indiana. Gross played basketball for Indiana State University and for Marshall University for two seasons (1991–92 and 1992–93).

Gross started his rugby career far later than most international players, even those from countries like the United States where rugby is not a major sport, not taking up the sport seriously until age 24, after he had attended university. He began his rugby career with the Cincinnati Wolfhounds. Gross was spotted by Dick Best, coach of the Harlequins.

Gross' 6"9' frame gave him a considerable presence in the line-out. Gross earned 62 caps in 61 starts for the United States from 1996 to 2003, including 7 starts at the 1999 and 2003 Rugby World Cups. Gross played his first test for the U.S. in 1996 against Ireland. His last four test matches came at the 2003 World Cup, which included a win over Japan.
Although he was named to the USA squad for the 2007 Rugby World Cup, and played in the 2007 squad's final warmup against Celtic League side Munster, he did not play in the World Cup itself.

Gross moved to Italy to play for Rivigo in 1998, and then played for Roma where the team won the Italian Cup.  Gross last played rugby for the Doncaster Knights, who play in National Division One, the second level of the game in England.

Clubs
  Harlequins FC
  Rugby Rovigo
  Rugby Roma
  Llanelli Scarlets
  Rotherham Titans
  Newcastle Falcons
  Doncaster Knights
  Sheffield Tigers

Coaching and administration
Gross has worked for several years at the USA Rugby National Office in Boulder, Colorado as the High Performance Player Development Manager, helping and coaching at USA Eagles and All-Americans camps. During part of this time he was also a very successful head coach for the University of Colorado-Boulder. 
In February 2016, Gross was announced as the head coach of the new Sacramento PRO Rugby team.

In August 2022, Gross accepted the position as head coach of the Indiana University Men's Rugby team.

See also
 United States national rugby union team

References

External links 
 USA Rugby profile
 http://statistics.scrum.com/rugby_stats_05.asp?ID=UGR4

1969 births
Rugby union players from Indiana
Rugby union coaches from Indiana
Doncaster R.F.C. players
Living people
Marshall Thundering Herd men's basketball players
People from Decatur, Indiana
Rotherham Titans players
Rugby Roma Olimpic players
Rugby union locks
United States international rugby union players
American expatriate rugby union players
Expatriate rugby union players in Italy
Expatriate rugby union players in Wales
Expatriate rugby union players in England
American expatriate sportspeople in Italy
American expatriate sportspeople in Wales
American expatriate sportspeople in England
American men's basketball players
American rugby union players
Sportspeople from Indiana